The follis (plural folles; , , Fels) was a type of coin in the Roman and Byzantine traditions.

Roman coin

In the past, the term follis was used to describe a large bronze Roman coin introduced in about 294 (the actual name of this coin is unknown)
at the time of the coinage reform of Diocletian. It weighed about 10 grams and was about 4% silver, mostly as a thin layer on the surface. However, later studies have shown that this is wrong, and that this coin may have been known as a "nummus". The word follis means bag (usually made of leather) in Latin, and there is evidence that this term was used in antiquity for a sealed bag containing a specific amount of coinage. It has also been suggested that the coin was named Follis because of the ancient Greek word "φολίς" meaning a thin layer of metal (cf. Latin folium, "leaf") which covers the surface of various objects, since originally, this coin had a thin layer of silver on top. The 'follis' of Diocletian, despite efforts to enforce prices with the Edict on Maximum Prices (301), was revalued and reduced as time passed. By the time of Constantine the Great, it was smaller and barely contained any silver. A series of Constantinian bronzes was introduced in the mid-4th century, although the specific denominations are unclear and debated by historians and numismatists. They are referred to as AE1, AE2, AE3 and AE4, with the former being the largest (near 27 mm) and the latter the smallest (averaging 15 mm) in diameter. Namely:

Fourth century folles represent the largest category of coin finds in the United Kingdom.

Byzantine coin

The follis was reintroduced as a large bronze coin (40 nummi) in 498, with the coinage reform of Anastasius, which included a series of bronze denominations with their values marked in Greek numerals. A 40 nummi coin of Anastasius is depicted on the obverse of the North Macedonian 50 denars banknote, issued in 1996.

The fals (a corruption of follis) was a bronze coin issued by the Umayyad and Abbasid caliphates beginning in the late 8th century, initially as imitations of the Byzantine follis.

See also
Trifollaro, a medieval coin worth 3 folles
Fals, Copper coin of Umayyads and Abbasids
Falus, former Moroccan coin
Fils, modern subdivision of certain Arab currencies

References

Sources

External links
 A close look at a follis by Doug Smith
 Follis Coin Catalog information and details
 Article from Forum coins

Coins of ancient Rome
Numismatics
Coins of the Byzantine Empire